Police Academy may refer to:

 Police academy, a training school for police recruits
 Police Academy (franchise), a 1984–1994 series of seven films
 Police Academy (film), the first film in the Police Academy franchise
 Police Academy (TV series), a 1988–89 animated series
 Police Academy: The Series, a 1997–98 live-action TV series
 Police Academy Stunt Show, a theme park attraction
 Strontium 90: Police Academy, a 1997 album by Strontium 90
 Police Academy Hyderabad, national police academy in Hyderabad, India
 Al-Shorta SC, an Iraqi football club that once played under the name of Madaris Al-Shorta, meaning Police Schools

See also
 University police
 College of Policing
 Police (disambiguation)
 Academy (disambiguation)
 Police Story (disambiguation)